Manly United Football Club is an Australian football club based in the northern beaches area of Sydney. The club competes in the National Premier Leagues NSW and their home ground is Cromer Park, in the suburb of Dee Why, approximately 15 minutes away from Manly.

Its main grandstand is named after former Socceroo captain Lucas Neill, who played for the club as a junior before playing overseas at Blackburn Rovers and West Ham United.

Manly United Football Club Ltd. was officially formed in 2004 by the Manly Warringah Soccer Association. However, there have been many representative teams competing for the association prior to this date. Notably, the previous club was called Manly Warringah Dolphins, that formed from the merger of Manly-North Shore United and Warringah Freshwater at the close of the 1991 NSW Division 1 season for the start of the upcoming 1992 NSW Super League season.

History

Neerlandia / Manly Warringah
A Dutch club called Neerlandia competed in the 1959 Sydney Federation Division Two, won the premiership and gained entry into the Sydney Federation Division One for 1960.

The club changed its name to Manly Warringah from 1960. The side had spent 14 seasons throughout the New South Wales top flight in 1960, 1968, and from 1976 to 1987 before being relegated to Division Two. With the club struggling, it merged with North Shore United in 1991. North Shore United itself was a merger of two clubs Ku-Ring-Gai and North Sydney-Artarmon (for the 1989 season). The Manly-North Shore United merger dissolved after the 1991 NSW Division One season, with Manly merging with Warringah Freshwater. North Shore United would continue to send representative teams to tournaments as Ku-Ring-Gai Districts.

Warringah Freshwater
Warringah Narrabeen (and from 1986 Warringah Freshwater) was a club that had competed throughout the early 1980s in NSW Division Two, even winning the title in 1983. With promotion in 1984 to NSW Division One, the club maintained mid-lower half of the table across their eight-year sojourn in the top flight. Their highest place finish was 5th, achieved in 1991 before merging with Manly for the newly revamped "NSW Super League" in 1992.

Manly Warringah Dolphins
The merger of Manly-North Shore United and Warringah Freshwater created the Manly Warringah Dolphins at the close of the 1991 NSW Division 1 season for the start of the upcoming NSW Super League season. The club had gained promotion into the NSW Premier League for the start of the 2004–05 season. At the time, the club was operating solely as a representative branch for the Manly Warringah Soccer Association (MWSA). However, it was a requirement from Soccer NSW that all Federation Clubs be a separate incorporated body and so Manly United Football Club Ltd. was formed.

Manly United (2004–present)
Manly United have competed in the NSW Tier 1 since 2004–05 when they were elevated to the NSW Premier League after winning the Super League Division. Manly United is considered an important side in the NSWPL, as it is based on a geographical area, rather than founded by a single ethnic group like some other ex-NSL clubs.

The original Logo of the renamed Manly United Football Club in 2004 was a collective of an Osprey sea bird, a Football & a Dolphin joined as one, these three icons represent the local MWFA Association (Osprey), a Football & Manly Warringah Dolphins (Dolphin). The Club again changed its logo in 2016 to reflect the evolution of Manly United Football Club and its ownership and association with Manly Warringah Football Association.

The club is the representative arm of the Manly Warringah Football Association (MWFA), the largest community Football Association in Australia with more than 20,000 players.

Divisional History
2004–2012: NSW Premier League (NSW Tier 1)
2013–present: National Premier Leagues NSW (NSW Tier 1)

Manly Warringah Dolphins
1992–1996: Super League (NSW Tier 1)
1997–1999: Division One (NSW Tier 2)
2000: Super League (NSW Tier 1)
2001–2004: Winter Super League (NSW Tier 2)

Lucas Neill Scholarship and Medal
Between 2006 and 2012 ex-Manly junior Lucas Neill helped provide opportunities for up and coming footballers from his junior club. Each year the scholarship was awarded to a different young player from Manly to trial in Europe.

Due to a number of factors including difficulty getting clubs in Europe to provide the opportunity for the players, the scheme was discontinued as Lucas and his advisors looked for a different way to reward the junior 
players from his junior club.

In 2014 the scholarship was re-branded the Lucas Neill Medal and was extended to include ALL junior members of the club, it was determined that there should be two medals awarded each year, in recognition of the advancements in ladies football. 
The medal is made from Sterling silver and is laser engraved on the front with a photograph of Lucas when he first became captain of Australia in 2007.

Current Men's squad

Current Women's squad
.

Men's Seasons

Men's Honours
National Premier Leagues NSW
Men's Club Champions (1): 2016

National Premier Leagues NSW Grand Finals
Champions (1): 2017
Runners Up (1): 2022

Waratah Cup:
Champions (1): 2011
Runners-up (4): 2007, 2009, 2014, 2016

Manly Warringah Dolphins (1992–2004)
National Premier Leagues NSW
Premiers (1): 1995
Runners-Up (1): 1992

National Premier Leagues NSW Grand Finals
Champions (1): 1995,
Runners-Up (0):

National Premier Leagues NSW 2
Premiers (1): 2004
Runners-Up (1): 2002
National Premier Leagues NSW 2 Grand Finals
Champions (1): 2001
Runners-Up (2): 1994, 2004

References

External links
Official site

 
New South Wales Premier League teams
National Premier Leagues clubs
Manly, New South Wales
Association football clubs established in 2004
2004 establishments in Australia
Northern Beaches